ProLife Alliance was formed in the UK in October 1996, originally as a political party. It put up 56 candidates at the 1997 general election and also contested the 2001 general election 2004 European elections.


Election results

House of Commons

1997 general election

Source:

2001 general election

Source:

UK Parliament by-elections

1997-2001 Parliament

European Parliament election, 2004
20,393 votes total

Source:

References

1997 United Kingdom general election
Election results by party in the United Kingdom
Defunct political parties in the United Kingdom
Political parties established in 1996
Political parties disestablished in 1997